Maria Lea Carmen Imutan Salonga  (born February 22, 1971), known professionally as Lea Salonga, is a Filipina singer, actress, columnist, and producer. Nicknamed "Pride of the Philippines," she is best known for her roles in musical theatre, for supplying the singing voices of two Disney Princesses (Jasmine and Mulan), and as a recording artist and television performer. Throughout her career, she has achieved numerous accolades and honors, becoming an internationally-recognized figure in music and entertainment.

At age eighteen, Salonga rose to international recognition when she originated the lead role of Kim in the musical Miss Saigon in the West End and won the Laurence Olivier Award for Best Actress in a Musical. She then reprised the role on Broadway, winning the Drama Desk Award, Outer Critics Circle Award, and Theatre World Awards before making history as the first Asian actress to win a Tony Award and the second-youngest actress to win for Best Performance by a Leading Actress in a Musical.

Salonga was the first actress of Asian descent to play the roles of Éponine and Fantine in the musical Les Misérables on Broadway. She also portrayed Éponine and Fantine in the musical's 10th and 25th anniversary concerts, respectively, in London. She provided the singing voices of two official Disney Princesses: Princess Jasmine in Aladdin (1992) and Fa Mulan in Mulan (1998) and Mulan II (2004). She was named a Disney Legend in 2011 for her work with The Walt Disney Company. Salonga starred as Wu Mei-Li in the 2002 Broadway revival of Flower Drum Song. From 2015 to 2016, she returned to Broadway to portray Kei Kimura in Allegiance, and from 2017 to 2019, she appeared as Erzulie in the Broadway revival of Once on This Island.

Salonga was the first Filipino artist to sign with an international record label (Atlantic Records in 1993). In her career, she has performed for six Philippine presidents (Ferdinand Marcos, Corazon Aquino, Fidel V. Ramos, Joseph Estrada, Gloria Macapagal Arroyo, and Benigno S. Aquino III), three American presidents (George H. W. Bush, Bill Clinton, and George W. Bush), and for Diana, Princess of Wales and Her Majesty Queen Elizabeth II. She has toured widely as a concert artist and has played numerous theatre, film, and television roles in North America, Europe, and Asia.

Aside from her career, Salonga is an active supporter of non-traditional casting, women's rights, reproductive rights, sex education, and LGBT rights.

Early life and education 
Maria Lea Carmen Imutan Salonga was born on February 22, 1971, in the Ermita district of Manila, Philippines to Feliciano Genuino Salonga, a naval rear admiral and shipping company owner, and María Ligaya Alcántara, née Imutan of Pulupandan, Negros Occidental. She spent the first six years of her childhood in Angeles City before returning to Manila. As a child, Salonga sang at family parties before being encouraged by her cousin to audition for an upcoming production of The King and I, where she made her professional debut.

While living in Angeles City, Salonga studied at the local O.B. Montessori Center campus. She later transferred to the campus in Greenhills, San Juan, Metro Manila to complete her secondary education, graduating as the class valedictorian in 1988. She later attended the University of the Philippines College of Music's extension program aimed at training musically talented children in music and stage movement. A college freshman studying biology at the Ateneo de Manila University when she auditioned for Miss Saigon, she intended to have a medical career. In the early 2000s, in between jobs in New York, she took two courses, Philosophy and European History, at Fordham University's Lincoln Center campus.

Career

1971–1989: Career beginnings and Small Voice
As a child, Salonga began singing at family parties. Her cousin, who was active with Repertory Philippines, encouraged her to audition for a production of The King and I, where she made her professional debut in 1978 at the age of seven. While performing with the company, she was trained by founders Baby Barredo and Zenaida “Bibot” Amador. She played the title role in Annie in 1980, later reprising the role in 1984, and appeared in other productions such as Cat on a Hot Tin Roof (1978), Fiddler on the Roof (1978), The Sound of Music (1980), The Rose Tattoo (1980), The Goodbye Girl (1982), Paper Moon (1983), and The Fantasticks (1988).

In 1981, Salonga released her first album, Small Voice, which was certified gold in the Philippines, and made her film debut in the comedy film Tropang Bulilit. As a young performer, Salonga received a Filipino Academy of Movie Arts and Sciences (FAMAS) award nomination for Best Child Actress and three Aliw Awards for best child performer in 1980, 1981, and 1982. From 1983 to 1985, she hosted her musical television show, Love, Lea, and was a member of the cast of German Moreno's teen variety show, That's Entertainment. 

In 1985, Salonga and her brother, Gerard, took part in the 8th Metro Manila Popular Music Festival as the interpreters for the song entry titled "Musika, Lata, Sipol at La La La," composed by Tess Concepcion, which won second prize in the Amateur Division. That same year, she opened for Puerto Rican boy band Menudo in their concerts in Manila. She again performed with the group in 1986 and 1987, also appearing on their English-Tagalog album, In Action. As a teenager, Salonga continued to act in films, appearing in Like Father, Like Son (1985), Ninja Kids (1986), Captain Barbell (1986), and Pik Pak Boom (1988). In 1988, she released her second studio album, Lea, and opened for Stevie Wonder in Manila.

1989–1992: Miss Saigon and Aladdin

In 1989, Salonga originated the leading role of Kim in the debut production of the musical Miss Saigon in London. For her initial Manila audition in 1988, the then 17-year-old Salonga chose to sing Alain Boublil and Claude-Michel Schönberg's "On My Own" from Les Misérables. Salonga has sometimes credited the song as the starting point of her international career. After hearing her rendition, she was asked if she had prepared another song to perform. Although she had not prepared another song for the audition, she chose to sing "The Greatest Love of All." At her first callback audition, Salonga was asked to sing "Sun and Moon" and "The Movie in My Mind," impressing the audition panel. In December 1988, Salonga appeared before the panel at the Theatre Royal, Drury Lane in London to perform "I'd Give My Life For You" and "Too Much For One Heart." After three days of intensive work sessions in London, Salonga was offered the lead role. During an episode of "Stars in the House" streamed on March 28, 2020, Salonga told Seth Rudetsky and his husband, producer James Wesley, that she found out that she was officially cast when she read the Sunday supplement of the Daily Mail.

For her performance as Kim, Salonga won the 1990 Laurence Olivier Award for Best Actress in a Musical, becoming one of the youngest winners of the award. On December 21, 1990, Salonga performed with the Philippine Philharmonic Orchestra, Ateneo College Glee Club, and guest singer Robert Seña in a homecoming concert in Manila entitled A Miss Called Lea, which was later broadcast on television. She also received a Presidential Award of Merit from President Corazon Aquino for her services to the arts.

When Miss Saigon opened on Broadway in 1991, she again played the role of Kim, winning the Drama Desk, Outer Critics Circle, and Theatre World awards and becoming the second-youngest actress and first actress of Asian descent to win a Tony Award. During the production transfer from West End to Broadway, a controversy erupted over Salonga's citizenship. The Actors' Equity Association (AEA) initially prevented her from reprising the role, wishing to give priority to Asian-American performers. However, Cameron Mackintosh claimed he could not find a satisfactory replacement for Salonga, and an arbitrator later reversed the AEA ruling. In 1993 and 1996, she returned to play Kim on Broadway. In 1999, she was invited back to London to close the West End production, and in 2001, at the age of 29 and after finishing the Manila run of the musical, Salonga returned to Broadway to close that production.

In 1991, she was named one of People magazine's 50 Most Beautiful People. In 1992, she performed the singing voice of Princess Jasmine in Disney's animated film Aladdin. Later that year, Salonga's agent submitted her to an audition for the leading role of Eliza Doolittle in the upcoming Broadway revival of My Fair Lady. However, the casting director for the production refused to see her because of her race. Shortly after, Salonga was contacted by Cameron Mackintosh to join the Broadway production of Les Misérables.

1993–1996: Les Misérables, films, and other musicals

In 1993, Salonga played the role of Éponine in the Broadway production of Les Misérables, becoming the first Asian actress to perform the role on Broadway. She performed the song "A Whole New World" from Aladdin with Brad Kane at the 65th Annual Academy Awards in Los Angeles, where the song won an Oscar, having already won a Golden Globe Award. That same year, she released her self-titled international debut album with Atlantic Records. In 1994, Salonga played in various musical theatre productions in the Philippines and Singapore, such as Sandy in Grease, Eliza Doolittle in My Fair Lady, and the Witch in Into the Woods.

In the U.S. in 1995, Salonga played the role of Geri Riordan, an 18-year-old adopted Vietnamese American child in the Hallmark Hall of Fame TV movie Redwood Curtain, which starred John Lithgow and Jeff Daniels. She then flew back to the Philippines to star with Filipino matinée idol Aga Muhlach in the critically acclaimed film Sana Maulit Muli, which gave her a second Filipino Academy of Movie Arts and Sciences (FAMAS) award nomination, this time for Best Actress. She reprised the role of Éponine in the 10th-anniversary concert of Les Misérables at the Royal Albert Hall in London, which was recorded and later released as a film titled Les Misérables: The Dream Cast in Concert.

In 1996, Salonga was again in Les Misérables as Éponine in the West End production of the musical. In September of that same year, she continued to perform the role at the Neal S. Blaisdell Concert Hall in Honolulu, Hawaii, during the musical's U.S. national tour.

In December 1996, Salonga represented the Philippines while performing at ONE: The WTO Show, the closing ceremony for the inaugural World Trade Organization (WTO) ministerial conference held at the Suntec Singapore Convention and Exhibition Centre.

1997–2004: Recordings, concerts, television, and Flower Drum Song

From 1997 to 2000, Salonga did recordings and concerts in the Philippines, another engagement in London, and a few returns to Miss Saigon in London and on Broadway. In 1997, she released I'd Like to Teach The World to Sing to gold sales in the Philippines. That recording was followed by Lea... In Love in 1998 and By Heart in 2000, both albums reaching multiple platinum status in the Philippines. In 1998, she again provided the singing voice for the title character in Mulan before later reprising the role in the 2004 sequel, Mulan II. At age 28, Salonga moved to New York City, purchasing her own apartment (which she still owns up to at least 2013). She participated in the 1998 tribute concert to Cameron Mackintosh in London entitled Hey, Mr. Producer!, where she performed numbers from several of his musicals. In December 1998, Salonga appeared in an international panel of performers, along with Iain Glen, Nicole Kidman, and Anna Manahan, for episode 277 of the American Theatre Wing’s documentary series, Working in the Theatre. In the Philippines in 1999 and again in 2000, she played Sonia Walsk in They're Playing Our Song. She also performed in four concerts: The Homecoming Concert, The Millennium Concert, The Best of Manila, and Songs from the Screen–the last two being benefit shows. Salonga returned to Manila in Miss Saigon, staged at the Cultural Center of the Philippines at the end of 2000.

After her final stint in Miss Saigon for its closing on Broadway in 2001, Salonga recreated the role of Lien Hughes, originally played by Ming-Na Wen, in the soap opera As the World Turns. After completing her contract that year, she was asked to return to the role in 2003. She guested on Russell Watson's The Voice concert, narrated for the television special My America: A Poetry Atlas of the United States, and appeared on the Season 8 Christmas episode of the television medical drama ER, playing a patient with lymphoma.

In 2002, Salonga returned to Broadway to play the leading role of Wu Mei-Li, a Chinese immigrant in a reinterpretation of Rodgers and Hammerstein's Flower Drum Song opposite Jose Llana. This was after the reinvented musical had a run at the Mark Taper Forum in Los Angeles in 2001 with Salonga playing the role and in 2002 winning Lead Actress in a Musical from the Los Angeles theatre Ovation Awards. The Salonga-led Broadway revival cast album was nominated for a 2004 Grammy Award for Best Musical Show Album. Salonga's performance was received positively by theatre critics in New York, and she received a nomination for Distinguished Performance from the Drama League, among other honors. In September 2002, she appeared on Working in the Theatre for a second time, along with John Cullum, Edie Falco, Stanley Tucci, Marissa Jaret Winokur, and Charlayne Woodard. Between the 2001 Los Angeles and 2002 Broadway productions of Flower Drum Song, she performed in a non-musical theatrical production for the first time, playing the role of Catherine in the stage play Proof in Manila. This was followed by a major concert, The Broadway Concert, at the Philippine International Convention Center. She also sang at the 56th Tony Awards with Harry Connick Jr., Peter Gallagher, and Michele Lee in a number paying tribute to Richard Rodgers.

From 2003 to 2004, Salonga did her first "all-Filipino" concerts in Manila called Songs from Home, which later won her an Aliw Award as Entertainer of the Year. In 2003, she performed in several concerts at the Mohegan Sun hotel in Connecticut. This was followed by a Christmas concert in the Philippines called Home for Christmas and performances at the Lenape Regional Performing Arts Center in Marlton, New Jersey, in 2004. Later in 2004, she played Lizzie in the Manila production of the musical Baby, which earned her another nomination from the Aliw Awards.

2005–2007: International ventures

In 2005, Salonga gave her first U.S. concert tour. Later that year, on November 7, she performed to a sold-out crowd at Carnegie Hall for the benefit of Diverse City Theater Company. The same year, she received the Golden Artist Award at the 53rd FAMAS Awards in honor of her international achievements, performed during the grand opening of Hong Kong's Disneyland, and recorded two songs on Daniel Rodriguez's album In the Presence. She also did voice work for Disney's English dub of Hayao Miyazaki's My Neighbor Totoro as Yasuko Kusakabe. Salonga wrote the foreword to Linda Marquart's The Right Way to Sing (2005). In 2006, at the 15th Asian Games in Doha, Qatar, Salonga concluded the closing ceremony with the song "Triumph of the One" before an audience of 50,000 people at Khalifa International Stadium.

In 2007, Salonga released her first studio album in seven years called Inspired, which was certified platinum in the Philippines. On August 14, 2007, she received the Order of Lakandula, with the rank of Commander (Komandante), from Philippine President Gloria Arroyo in recognition of using her talents to benefit Philippine society and foster cultural exchange. She has also received the Congressional Medal of Achievement from the House of Representatives of the Philippines for showing "the extent and depth of the Filipino musical talent" and "opening the way for other Filipino artists to break into the finest theaters in the world."

In March 2007, Salonga returned to Broadway for another stint in the musical Les Misérables, this time as Fantine. Her rejoining the show boosted the musical's ticket sales. President Arroyo watched Salonga in this role, with Filipino Americans Adam Jacobs as Marius and Ali Ewoldt as Cosette. Salonga received rave reviews and made it again to the short list of Broadway.com's Audience Award favorites as Best Replacement. During her tenure on Broadway that season, she appeared in Broadway on Broadway 2007 and Stars in the Alley 2007, spoke at the Broadway Artists Alliance Summer Intensives, guested on the Broadway musical 25th Annual Putnam County Spelling Bee, and participated in Broadway Cares/Equity Fights AIDS' 12th Annual Nothing Like a Dame event to benefit the women's health initiative of The Actors Fund. Right after doing Les Misérables, she performed in two events: at the U.S. Military Academy Band's concert in West Point, where she sang four songs and an encore, and in her concert at the Tarrytown Music Hall in New York. She was then busy with other concerts and musical events, including a Christmas presentation in Manila.

2008–2012: Philippine Daily Inquirer columnist and touring
In 2008, Salonga gave concerts in the Philippines, California, Hawaii, Hong Kong, and Guam, On July 3, 2008, Salonga became a columnist in the Philippine Daily Inquirer with her column "Backstory" (Entertainment section), "Introducing: Lea Salonga, writer." Since then, she has written numerous columns for the Inquirer. She performed in "Global Pop" at the Music Center on July 11, 2008. It was presented by The Blue Ribbon, a group founded by Dorothy Chandler in 1968. Salonga gave a concert on July 11 at Los Angeles' Walt Disney Concert Hall. That same year, she received a special citation from the Awit Awards.From late July 2008 to mid-2009, Salonga played the title role in the 30-week Asian tour of Rodgers and Hammerstein's Cinderella, which premiered in Manila. Salonga performed a series of concerts in North America in 2009 and was asked to dance the Filipino novelty dances "Ocho-Ocho" and "Spaghetti." The same year, Salonga advertised the Avon Products line of anti-aging skin care products Anew Rejuvenate in the Philippines. In June 2009, she sang at the 95th Anniversary Special of the Iglesia ni Cristo. Salonga sang Patriotic song "Bayan Ko" at the Requiem Mass for former President Corazon Aquino at Manila Cathedral. Salonga celebrated 20 years of Miss Saigon by performing in concerts called Lea Salonga... Your Songs at the Philippine International Convention Center Plenary Hall on December 11 and 12, 2009. In the same venue, Salonga received Gusi Peace Prize in November 2009.

From July to August 2010, Salonga played the role of Grizabella in the Manila run of the Asia-Pacific tour of Andrew Lloyd Webber's Cats at the Cultural Center of the Philippines. In October, she played Fantine during the 25th Anniversary Concert of Les Misérables, fifteen years after appearing in the 10th Anniversary as Eponine. The same year, she served as a celebrity judge for Avon Voices.

Salonga was honored as a Disney Legend on August 19, 2011. She was one of the judges in the Miss Universe 2011 pageant in São Paulo, Brazil on September 12, 2011. Salonga, along with Darren Criss, sang "A Whole New World" to its composer, Alan Menken, as Menken was named the winner of the 2011 Maestro Award at the Billboard/Hollywood Reporter Film & TV Music Conference on October 24, 2011.

Salonga performed in a six-concert series titled The Magic of Broadway and Disney Favorites in 2012 with the Palm Beach Pops. She starred in the first production of Allegiance at the Old Globe Theatre in San Diego from September to October 2012. Salonga starred in the Philippine production of the comedy God of Carnage in July 2012 at the Carlos P. Romulo Auditorium, RCBC Plaza, Manila. She took on the same role at the DBS Arts Centre in Singapore in November 2012. Salonga joined the Candlelight Processional at Epcot in Walt Disney World as narrator on December 14 to 16, retelling the Christmas story accompanied by a 50-piece orchestra and a mass choir.

2013–2018: The Voice of the Philippines and return to Broadway
In January 2013, Salonga participated in Lincoln Center's American Songbook concert series at the Allen Room. In February in the Philippines, Salonga provided the theme song for TV5's reality singing competition Kanta Pilipinas and, together with Tyne Daly and Norm Lewis, she starred as Mother in a concert performance of Ragtime at Lincoln Center's Avery Fisher Hall. Salonga headlined a concert series, "4 Stars One World of Broadway Musicals," in Tokyo Osaka in June, performing with Ramin Karimloo, Sierra Boggess, and Yu Shirota. She was one of the four coaches, together with apl.de.ap, Sarah Geronimo, and Bamboo Mañalac, for the ABS-CBN program, The Voice of the Philippines, which premiered in June 2013. In December 2013, Salonga began her Lea Salonga: Playlist concert tour in the Philippines, which celebrated her 35 years in show business. The concert series was extended to January 2014. Salonga wrote a book, Playlist: A Celebration of 35 Years, which she used as a souvenir program for the concerts.

In 2014, she returned for the second season of The Voice of the Philippines and joined the new Philippine version of The Voice Kids, on which she has appeared for three seasons. Salonga recorded a song titled "Wished That I Could Call You" that was included in the charity compilation album Children In Need, released in March 2014. Also, in 2014 and 2015, she toured Asia and North America with Il Divo. In mid-2015, she performed a concert series in Australasia. Salonga reprised her role as Kei Kimura in the 2015–16 Broadway production of Allegiance. In The New York Times, Charles Isherwood wrote of her performance: "Her voice retains its plush beauty, and her culminating first act solo, 'Higher' ... is perhaps the show's musical highlight." Salonga guest-starred on the April 2016 season finale of the American television series Crazy Ex-Girlfriend, playing Filipino-heritage character Josh's visiting aunt, a former Star Search contestant, in town for a wedding, at which she sings the episode's climactic Disney princess parody song, "One Indescribable Instant."

In Manila in November 2016, she appeared as Helen Bechdel in the international premiere of Fun Home. A review in ABS-CBN News said that she "delivers a finely tuned performance, utilizing her prodigious stage presence to provide the cold and dark shadings to erstwhile peppy scenes with her subtle stares and held back emotions. ... [In] "Days by Days" ... she finally lets go of all the resentment and repressed anger of a woman stuck in a marriage built on a lie. Yet there is dignity in her breakdown ... Salonga pulls it off with such clarity, both musically and emotionally, that it's difficult not to be moved."

In 2016, Salonga won two more Aliw Awards, one for Best Major Concert in a Foreign Venue and her second Entertainer of the Year award. The following year, Salonga was one of the coaches on The Voice Teens. Also in 2017, she released an album, Bahaghari: Lea Salonga Sings Traditional Songs of the Philippines, with songs sung in several languages spoken in the Philippines. Salonga portrayed Erzulie in the 2017 Broadway revival of Once on This Island at Circle in the Square Theatre, where she received critical praise for her vocal performance. She returned to the show for its final performances in December 2018 and January 2019. Once on this Island was nominated for a Grammy Award for Best Musical Theater Album.

2019–present: Yellow Rose, Dream Again tour, and Pretty Little Liars: Original Sin
Salonga appeared alongside Eva Noblezada, Dale Watson, and Princess Punzalan as a Philippine immigrant, Aunt Gail, in the musical film Yellow Rose, which premiered at the 2019 Los Angeles Asian Pacific Film Festival. She also toured North America and the United Kingdom that year. Later in 2019, she played Mrs. Lovett in a revival of Sweeney Todd: The Demon Barber of Fleet Street in Manila and then Singapore. Critics praised her "crystalline tones that turned her numbers, especially 'By the Sea,' into unexpected show-stoppers" and called the performance a "career-high" for the actress. Between these two short runs, she gave concerts in Sydney, Melbourne, and Brisbane in November 2019.

In March 2020, shortly after performing in Dubai, Salonga announced that her 2020 North American tour would be rescheduled due to the onset of the COVID-19 pandemic. In May 2020, she announced that the tour would again be rescheduled to Fall 2021, but these dates were later rescheduled once more. During the pandemic, Salonga performed for several virtual global fundraising events and concerts. In August 2020, she released her single "Dream Again," a song of hope and persistence. On November 27, the PBS series Great Performances broadcast her 2019 concert at the Sydney Opera House, performed with the Sydney Symphony Orchestra.

In 2021, Salonga voiced the Mysterious Woman in the Netflix series Centaurworld. In September of the same year, she announced her Dream Again Tour, named after her 2020 single. One month later, she announced she would also be touring the United States and Canada. On December 25, 2021, Salonga returned to Dubai to perform a Christmas concert for Expo 2020 at the Dubai Exhibition Centre.

On April 6, 2022, Salonga began her Dream Again Tour in the United States and Canada. Following the completion of this tour, she performed the song "The Prayer" at the 2022 National Memorial Day Concert on the West Lawn of the United States Capitol in Washington, D.C., which was broadcast on PBS. On June 18, she continued her tour in the United Kingdom. On July 28, the critically acclaimed series Pretty Little Liars: Original Sin premiered on HBO Max, where Salonga portrays Elodie Honrada. In September 2022, Salonga began portraying Mama Soubirous in the Indie Theatrical workshop of the new musical adaptation of The Song of Bernadette in Manhattan. In the same month, she was recognized by TIME magazine at the TIME100 Impact Awards for being a "life-long role model for children of color." On October 27, 2022, Salonga was featured on Pentatonix's cover of Jose Mari Chan's "Christmas In Our Hearts" in their Christmas album, Holidays Around The World. On December 15, 16, and 17, 2022, Salonga performed with The Tabernacle Choir as the featured guest artist in a series of Christmas concerts at the Conference Center in Salt Lake City, Utah. The event is set to be televised on PBS in December 2023.

On March 13, 2023, Salonga will perform at the annual Broadway Backwards event at the New Amsterdam Theatre. She is scheduled to join the Broadway cast and producing team of Here Lies Love for a five-week run in the summer of 2023 in the role of Aurora Aquino, mother of Ninoy Aquino. The production will notably mark the first time Salonga has played a Filipino role on the Broadway stage and will mark her return to the Broadway Theatre, where Miss Saigon played. She is also scheduled to return to London's West End and star alongside Bernadette Peters in the Stephen Sondheim tribute revue Stephen Sondheim's Old Friends, which is set to run at the Gielgud Theatre from September 16, 2023 to January 6, 2024.

Artistry

Musical style and themes 
In her popular music releases, Salonga has sung "simple love songs," which are common in Original Pilipino Music.

Influences 
Salonga's style and music has been inspired by musical artists such as ABBA, the Carpenters (particularly Karen Carpenter), Olivia Newton-John, the Osmonds, Elaine Paige, and Barbra Streisand. She has noted that these performers provided "clear voices that really helped the listener focus on the lyrics besides the tone and music."

Salonga has repeatedly praised Streisand as one of her favorites for her "mammoth" career in singing, acting, producing, and arranging. During her January 15, 2000 concert at the Philippine International Convention Center, Salonga called Streisand one of her idols.

Voice 
Salonga has been praised for her absolute pitch and control over her powerful vocals, which can evoke a wide array of emotion and soundscapes. Her voice has been described as "golden" by Marilyn Stasio for Variety magazine and "clear and as sparkling as Baccarat crystal" by Rex Reed for Observer.

Due to her vocal versatility, it is often debated on what her vocal range and type classifications are. When Salonga performed as Kim in Miss Saigon, she was expected to utilize most of her range, hitting notes as low as E3 and as high as D5. In both Disney Princess singing roles, Jasmine and Mulan, Salonga uses head tones that reach up to F5. Salonga has been recorded singing notes ranging from D3 to C6.

Other ventures

Philanthropy and activism 
On October 15, 2010, Salonga was appointed Goodwill Ambassador for the Food and Agriculture Organization (FAO) of the United Nations.

Salonga has been openly supportive of LGBT equality for many years. On October 12, 2009, during a benefit concert held at The Philippine Center's Kalayaan Hall for the victims of Typhoon Ondoy, Salonga referenced the National Equality March in Washington, D.C. and stated, "I believe that every single human being has the fundamental right to marry whoever they want." In 2011, The Advocate called her a "major gay icon." In February 2016, Salonga criticized Filipino politician and former professional boxer Manny Pacquiao via Twitter for his views on homosexuality and same-sex marriage.

On March 29, 2021, Salonga condemned the rise of violent attacks on Asian Americans during the COVID-19 pandemic. On April 21, 2021, she appeared with actress Lucy Liu, politician and First Lady Hillary Clinton, and others in the #AAPI Women Strong: Organizing Beyond A Hashtag forum to share their experiences and spread awareness on anti-Asian hate.

Personal life
Salonga lives in the Philippines and the United States.

Early relationships 
After performing in the 2000 Manila production of They're Playing Our Song, Salonga began a relationship with Korean-American co-star Michael K. Lee. The relationship ended in mid-2001.

Marriage and children 
In November 2001, while performing in the Los Angeles production of Flower Drum Song at the Mark Taper Forum, Salonga met Robert "Rob" Charles Chien, an American entrepreneur of Chinese and Japanese heritage. On January 10, 2004, Salonga and Chien married at the Our Lady of the Angels Cathedral. During the wedding ceremony, Salonga performed the song "Two Words," composed by Louie Ocampo and Freddie Santos, given to her as an early wedding present. The wedding was aired as a two-hour television special, which was directed by Bobby Garcia and hosted by Boy Abunda, on ABS-CBN in late January 2004.

They have one daughter together.

Notable relatives 
Salonga has notable relatives around the world, including Filipino musical conductor and arranger Gerard Salonga (brother), ballerina Maniya Barredo (first cousin), and Canadian actress and model Shay Mitchell (cousin).

Discography

Solo recordings
 Small Voice (1981)
 Lea (1988)
 Bakit Labis Kitang Mahal (1992)
 Lea Salonga (1993)
 I'd Like to Teach The World to Sing (1997)
 Lea... In Love (1998)
 By Heart (1999)
 Lea Salonga: The Christmas Album (2000)
 Songs from the Screen (2001)
 Inspired (2007)
 Lea Salonga: Your Songs (2010)
 Bahaghari [Rainbow]: Lea Salonga Sings Traditional Songs of the Philippines (2017)

Cast recordings
 Miss Saigon (Original London Cast Recording) (1989)
 Little Tramp (Studio Recording) (1992)
 The King and I (Hollywood Studio Cast Recording) (1992)
 Aladdin (Soundtrack Recording) (1992)
 Mulan (Soundtrack Recording) (1998)
 Making Tracks (Original Cast Recording) (2001)
 Flower Drum Song (Revival Cast Recording) (2002)
 Mulan II (Soundtrack Recording) (2005)
 Dayo: Sa Mundo ng Elementalia (Soundtrack Recording) (2008)
 Cinderella (Original International Tour Cast Recording) (2010)
 Allegiance (Original Broadway Cast Recording) (2016)
 Once on This Island (First Broadway Revival Cast Recording) (2018)

Video/Live recordings
 Hey Mr. Producer: The Musical World of Cameron Mackintosh (1997)
 Les Misérables: The Dream Cast in Concert (1995)
 Lea Salonga Live Vol. 1 (2000)
 Lea Salonga Live Vol. 2 (2000)
 The Broadway Concert (2002)
 Songs from Home: Live Concert Recording (2004)
 Les Misérables in Concert: The 25th Anniversary (2010)
 The Journey So Far – Recorded Live at Cafe Carlyle (2011)
 Live: Jazz at Lincoln Center (2016)
 Blurred Lines (2017)
 The Story of My Life: Lea Salonga Live from Manila (2019) with the BYU Chamber Orchestra
 Lea Salonga in Concert with the Sydney Symphony Orchestra (2020)

Compilation albums
 100% Lea Gives Her Best (2003)
 The Ultimate OPM Collection (2007)

Featured recordings
 Disney Princess: The Ultimate Song Collection (2004), for the song "If You Can Dream" (sung with Susan Logan, Grey Griffin, Jodi Benson, Paige O'Hara and Judy Kuhn)
 Disney Princess Enchanted Tales: Follow Your Dreams (2007), for the songs "Peacock Princess" (sung with Gilbert Gottfried) and "I've Got My Eyes on You"
 Shelldon (2008), for the song "It's a Brand New Day"
 Sofia the First (2014), for the songs "The Ride of Our Lives" (episode 12: "Two to Tangu") and "Stronger that You Know" (episode 36: "Princesses To The Rescue")

Acting credits
One of the most prolific actresses since her career's inception in 1978, Salonga has appeared in numerous international theatre productions, television shows, films, and video games.

In Manila, Salonga has appeared in theatre productions such as The King and I (1978), Cat on a Hot Tin Roof (1978), Fiddler on the Roof (1978), Annie (1980), The Sound of Music (1980), The Rose Tattoo (1980), The Bad Seed (1981), The Goodbye Girl (1982), The Paper Moon (1983), Annie (1984), The Fantasticks (1988), My Fair Lady (1994), Grease (1995), They're Playing Our Song (2000), Miss Saigon (2000), Proof (2002), Baby (2004), Cats (2010), God of Carnage (2012), Fun Home (2016), and Sweeney Todd: The Demon Barber of Fleet Street (2019). In London's West End, she has appeared in Miss Saigon (1989–1990, 1999) and Les Misérables (1996). She will return to the West End in September 2023 to appear in Stephen Sondheim's Old Friends. On Broadway, she has appeared in Miss Saigon (1991–1992, 1993, 1999, 2001), Les Misérables (1993), Flower Drum Song (2002–2003), Something Good: A Broadway Salute to Richard Rogers on His 100th Birthday (2002), Les Misérables (2007), Allegiance (2015–2016), and Once on This Island (2017–2018, 2018–2019). She will return to Broadway in the summer of 2023 to appear in Here Lies Love. Salonga has also appeared in Into the Woods (1994), They're Playing Our Song (1999), God of Carnage (2012), and Sweeney Todd: The Demon Barber of Fleet Street (2019) in Singapore, Les Misérables (1996) in Honolulu during the third U.S. national tour, Rodgers and Hammerstein's Cinderella (2008), Allegiance (2012) in San Diego, Annie (2018) at the Hollywood Bowl in Los Angeles, and the 10th and 25th anniversary concerts of Les Misérables at the Royal Albert Hall and The O2 Arena, respectively.

Salonga made her film debut in 1981 in the Filipino comedy Tropang Bulilit. She went on to appear in the films Like Father, Like Son (1985), Ninja Kids (1986), Captain Barbell (1986), Pik Pak Boom (1988), Dear Diary (1989), The Heat Is On (1989), Aladdin (1992), Bakit Labis Kitang Mahal (1992), Sana Maulit Muli (1995), Mulan (1998), Les Misérables: The Dream Cast in Concert (1998), My Neighbor Totoro (2004), Mulan II (2004), Disney Princess Enchanted Tales: Follow Your Dreams (2007), Les Misérables in Concert: The 25th Anniversary (2010), Miss Saigon: 25th Anniversary (2016), Allegiance (2016), Expedition Reef (2018), and Yellow Rose (2019).

In 1983, Salonga began hosting her own variety show entitled Love, Lea, which ended its run in 1985. She went on to appear in That's Entertainment (1986), Olsen Twins Mother's Day Special (1993), Sesame Street (1993), Reading Rainbow (1993, 2001), Redwood Curtain (1995), Aladdin on Ice (1995), ASAP (1997–present), ER (2001), As the World Turns (2001, 2003), Johnny Bravo (2004), Miss Universe 2011 (2011), Sofia the First (2012, 2014), The Voice of the Philippines (2013, 2014–15), The Voice Kids (2014–2019), Crazy Ex-Girlfriend (2016), Nature Is Speaking (2016), 91st Macy's Thanksgiving Day Parade (2017), The Voice Teens (2017, 2020), Centaurworld (2021), American Experience (2022), Pretty Little Liars: Original Sin (2022), and Little Demon (2022).

Achievements and legacy 

Salonga gained national recognition in the Philippines at a young age, winning Best Child Performer at the Aliw Awards in 1980, 1981, and 1982. For her success as a child singer and actress, she was known as the "Shirley Temple of the Philippines."

For her performance as the leading role of Kim in Miss Saigon, Salonga won Outstanding Performance of the Year by an Actress in a Musical at the 1990 Laurence Olivier Awards. After her return to the Philippines, she won Outstanding Performer at the Aliw Awards. In the same year, she received a Presidential Medal of Merit from President Corazon Aquino for her services to the arts. For reprising her role as Kim in the Broadway production of Miss Saigon, Salonga was awarded Outstanding Actress in a Musical at the 1991 Drama Desk Awards, Outstanding Actress in a Musical at the 1991 Outer Critics Circle Awards, Best Actress in a Musical at the 1991 Theatre World Awards, and Best Performance by an Actress in a Musical at the 45th Annual Tony Awards. She made history as the first Asian actress to win a Tony Award and the second-youngest actress to win for Best Performance by a Leading Actress in a Musical. She later became the first Asian actress to portray the role of Éponine when she joined the Broadway production in early 1993. In 1993, she also became the first Filipino artist to sign with an international record label when she signed with Atlantic Records.

In 2004, Salonga won Entertainer of the Year at the Aliw Awards. She later won the Aliw Award for Best Major Concert (Female) in 2008. In 2007, President Gloria Arroyo honored Salonga with the rank of Commander of the Order of Lakandula in recognition of using her talents to benefit Philippine society and foster cultural exchange. The House of Representatives of the Philippines also awarded her with the Congressional Medal of Achievement for showing "the extent and depth of the Filipino musical talent" and "opening the way for other Filipino artists to break into the finest theaters in the world."

In 2011, Salonga was declared a "Disney Legend" for her work with the Walt Disney Company, providing the singing voices for Princess Jasmine in Aladdin and Fa Mulan in Mulan and Mulan II. In September 2022, Salonga was recognized by TIME magazine at the TIME100 Impact Awards for being a "life-long role model for children of color." Salonga has been cited as an influence for several singers and actors, especially those of Asian descent, including Ali Ewoldt, Kimiko Glenn, Rachelle Ann Go, Bella Poarch, Nicole Scherzinger, and Phillipa Soo.

Published works

Books 

 Marquart, Linda; Salonga, Lea (2005). The Right Way to Sing. New York City, New York: Allworth Press. ISBN 1581154070.
 Michael, Ted; Salonga, Lea (2012). So You Wanna Be a Superstar?: The Ultimate Audition Guide. Philadelphia, Pennsylvania: Running Press Kids. ISBN 978-0762446100.

Columns 

 "Backstory." Inquirer Entertainment. Makati, Metro Manila: Philippine Daily Inquirer; Inquirer Holdings, Inc. . 2008–present.

Audiobooks 

 Ko, Lisa (Author); Lea Salonga (Narrator). The Contractors (2020). Amazon Original Stories. .

See also 
 Filipinos in the New York metropolitan area
 Honorific nicknames in popular music
 List of people with absolute pitch
 Recipients of Presidential Medal of Merit in the Philippines
 Tony Award for Best Actress in a Musical

Notes

References

Further reading 

 Fernandez, Yvette (2013). Princess Lea: The Life Story of Lea Salonga. Mandaluyong: Summit Publishing Company, Inc. ISBN 9789719902393.

External links

1971 births
20th-century Filipino actresses
20th-century Filipino women singers
21st-century Filipino actresses
21st-century Filipino women singers
ABS-CBN personalities
Actresses from Pampanga
Arista Records artists
Ateneo de Manila University alumni
Atlantic Records artists
Audiobook narrators
Capitol Records artists
Disney Legends
Disney people
Drama Desk Award winners
FAO Goodwill ambassadors
Filipino child actresses
Filipino child singers
Filipino expatriates in the United States
Filipino musical theatre actresses
Filipino voice actresses
Filipino women musicians
Fordham University alumni
GMA Network personalities
Kapampangan people
Laurence Olivier Award winners
 
Living people
People from Angeles City
People from Manila
Recipients of the Order of Lakandula
Recipients of the Presidential Medal of Merit (Philippines)
Singers from Pampanga
Sony Music Philippines artists
That's Entertainment (Philippine TV series)
That's Entertainment Thursday Group Members
Theatre World Award winners
Tony Award winners
Walt Disney Records artists